Yuan Fan (born November 6, 1986 in Shanghai) is a female Chinese football player who competed for the national team in the 2008 Summer Olympics. Her position is that of defender.

International goals

Major performances
2006 U20 World Cup - 2nd;
2006 Asian Cup - 1st;
2006 Asian Games - 3rd

References
http://2008teamchina.olympic.cn/index.php/personview/personsen/870
https://web.archive.org/web/20080811000433/http://results.beijing2008.cn/WRM/ENG/BIO/Athlete/7/236617.shtml

1986 births
Living people
Chinese women's footballers
Footballers at the 2008 Summer Olympics
Olympic footballers of China
Footballers from Shanghai
Asian Games medalists in football
Footballers at the 2006 Asian Games
Footballers at the 2010 Asian Games
China women's international footballers
Asian Games bronze medalists for China
Women's association football defenders
Medalists at the 2006 Asian Games